In computing, a null pointer or null reference is a value saved for indicating that the pointer or reference does not refer to a valid object. Programs routinely use null pointers to represent conditions such as the end of a list of unknown length or the failure to perform some action; this use of null pointers can be compared to nullable types and to the Nothing value in an option type.

A null pointer should not be confused with an uninitialized pointer: a null pointer is guaranteed to compare unequal to any pointer that points to a valid object. However, depending on the language and implementation, an uninitialized pointer may not have any such guarantee. It might compare equal to other, valid pointers; or it might compare equal to null pointers. It might do both at different times; or the comparison might be undefined behaviour.

C 

In C, two null pointers of any type are guaranteed to compare equal. The preprocessor macro NULL is defined as an implementation-defined null pointer constant, which in C99 can be portably expressed as ((void *)0) which means that the integer value 0 converted to the type void* (pointer to void). The C standard does not say that the null pointer is the same as the pointer to memory address 0, though that may be the case in practice. Dereferencing a null pointer is undefined behavior in C, and a conforming implementation is allowed to assume that any pointer that is dereferenced is not null.

In practice, dereferencing a null pointer may result in an attempted read or write from memory that is not mapped, triggering a segmentation fault or memory access violation. This may manifest itself as a program crash, or be transformed into a software exception that can be caught by program code. There are, however, certain circumstances where this is not the case. For example, in x86 real mode, the address 0000:0000 is readable and also usually writable, and dereferencing a pointer to that address is a perfectly valid but typically unwanted action that may lead to undefined but non-crashing behavior in the application. There are occasions when dereferencing the pointer to address zero is intentional and well-defined; for example, BIOS code written in C for 16-bit real-mode x86 devices may write the interrupt descriptor table (IDT) at physical address 0 of the machine by dereferencing a null pointer for writing. It is also possible for the compiler to optimize away the null pointer dereference, avoiding a segmentation fault but causing other undesired behavior.

C++ 

In C++, while the NULL macro was inherited from C, the integer literal for zero has been traditionally preferred to represent a null pointer constant. However, C++11 introduced the explicit null pointer constant nullptr to be used instead.

Other languages 

In some programming language environments (at least one proprietary Lisp implementation, for example), the value used as the null pointer (called nil in Lisp) may actually be a pointer to a block of internal data useful to the implementation (but not explicitly reachable from user programs), thus allowing the same register to be used as a useful constant and a quick way of accessing implementation internals.  This is known as the nil vector.

In languages with a tagged architecture, a possibly null pointer can be replaced with a tagged union which enforces explicit handling of the exceptional case; in fact, a possibly null pointer can be seen as a tagged pointer with a computed tag.

Programming languages use different literals for the null pointer. In Python, for example, a null value is called None. In Pascal and Swift, a null pointer is called nil. In Eiffel, it is called a void reference.

Null dereferencing 

Because a null pointer does not point to a meaningful object, an attempt to dereference (i.e., access the data stored at that memory location) a null pointer usually (but not always) causes a run-time error or immediate program crash.
 In C, dereferencing a null pointer is undefined behavior. Many implementations cause such code to result in the program being halted with an access violation, because the null pointer representation is chosen to be an address that is never allocated by the system for storing objects.  However, this behavior is not universal. It's also not guaranteed, since compilers are permitted to optimize programs under the assumption that they're free of undefined behaviour.

 In Delphi and many other Pascal implementations, the constant nil represents a null pointer to the first address in memory which is also used to initialize managed variables. Dereferencing it raises an external OS exception which is being mapped onto a Pascal '' exception instance if the  unit is linked in the uses clause.
 In Lisp,  is a first class object. So dereferencing  in these contexts will not cause an error, but poorly written code can get into an infinite loop.
Although catching these is generally considered bad practice, this exception type can be caught and handled by the program.
 In Objective-C, messages may be sent to a nil object (which is a null pointer) without causing the program to be interrupted; the message is simply ignored, and the return value (if any) is nil or 0, depending on the type.
 Before the introduction of Supervisor Mode Access Prevention (SMAP), a null pointer dereference bug could be exploited by mapping pagezero into the attacker's address space and hence causing the null pointer to point to that region. This could lead to code execution in some cases.

Mitigation 

There are techniques to facilitate debugging null pointer dereferences. Bond et al. suggest to modify the Java Virtual Machine (JVM) in order to keep track of null propagation.

Pure functional languages and user code run in many interpreted or virtual-machine languages do not suffer the problem of null pointer dereferencing, since no direct access is provided to pointers and, in the case of pure functional languages, all code and data is immutable.

Where a language does provide or utilise pointers which could otherwise become void, it may be possible to mitigate or avoid runtime null dereferences by providing compilation-time checking via static analysis or other techniques, with a burgeoning movement toward syntactic assistance from language features such as those seen in modern versions of the Eiffel programming language, D, and Rust.

Similar analysis can be performed using external tools, in some languages.

History 

In 2009, Tony Hoare stated
that he invented the null reference in 1965 as part of the ALGOL W language. In that 2009 reference Hoare describes his invention as a "billion-dollar mistake":

See also
 Memory debugger
 Zero page

References

Citations

Sources 

 

Data types